Ahrar or al ahrar (Arabic, 'free ones' or 'liberals'), singular al hurr, or variants, may refer to:

Organisations and political parties
Ahrar Party (Azerbaijan), 1918–1920
Liberal Socialists Party (Hizb al-Ahrar), Egypt, founded 1976
Ahrar Party (India), or Majlis-e-Ahrar-e-Islam, founded in Punjab 1929
Majlis-e-Ahrar-e-Islam
National Liberal Party (Lebanon), or Al-Wataniyyuun al Ahrar, founded 1958
Al-Ahrar Bloc, Iraq, founded in 2014
Ahrar ul Hind, Pakistan, founded in 2014
Jamaat-ul-Ahrar, a Pakistani terrorist organization, founded 2014

Syrian Civil War groups
Ahrar al-Jazeera brigade
Ahrar al-Sham
Jaysh al-Ahrar
Ahrar al-Sharkas
Ahrar al-Sharqiya
Liwa Ahrar Souriya

Media
Al Ahrar (weekly), Egyptian newspaper (1977–2013)
Libya Al Ahrar TV, Libyan TV channel

People
Al-Hurr ibn Yazid al Tamimi, a general of the Umayyad army 
Al-Hurr al-Amili (1624–1693), a Twelver Shi’a scholar
Al-Hurr ibn Abd al-Rahman al-Thaqafi, an early Umayyad governor

Other uses
Al-Ahrar subdistrict, An Numaniyah district, Wasit Governorate, Iraq
Banu al-Ahrar, or al Abna, a colony in pre-Islamic and early Islamic Yemen 
Al Hurr, the star Lambda Aurigae
Al-Hurr SC, an Iraqi football team
Horr (book) (Persian: حر), by Ali Shariati

See also

Hur (disambiguation)
Hurra (disambiguation)
Hurriya (disambiguation)
Hur (Bible), a companion of Moses and Aaron
Ben-Hur (disambiguation)
Umm al Ahrar, a Saharan desert oasis town in the Fezzan region of southwest Libya